Sloan Creek is the largest tributary of the North Fork Sauk River, entering the river about  above the mouth of Lost Creek. According to Fred Beckey, Cadet Creek is larger than Sloan Creek and could be equally considered the head of the Sauk River as the North Fork itself.

Course 
Sloan Creek begins at the outlet of Blue Lake, which is located a slight 0.4 miles west of the unnamed lake that is the source of the North Fork Sauk River. The creek exits Little Blue Lake and flows northwest for about  until it turns north at its confluence with Cadet Creek. It picks up the waters of Bowser Creek about 2.3 miles above the mouth of Cadet Creek. From the mouth of Cadet Creek, the creek flows north for about 1.9 miles to its mouth. Sloan Creek shares its name with a mountain to the west, Sloan Peak.

See also
List of rivers in Washington

References

Rivers of Washington (state)
North Cascades of Washington (state)
Rivers of Snohomish County, Washington